Crawfordsville School District was a school district headquartered in Crawfordsville, Arkansas. It had elementary and high school divisions.

On July 1, 2004, the former Crawfordsville School District consolidated with the Marion School District.

References

Further reading
Map of the Crawfordsville district:
  (Download)

External links

Defunct school districts in Arkansas
Education in Crittenden County, Arkansas
2004 disestablishments in Arkansas
School districts disestablished in 2004